Sierra de Álvarez Flora and Fauna Protection Area is a protected natural area in northeastern Mexico. It is located in the Sierra Madre Oriental of San Luis Potosí state. It was established in 2000 by the government of Mexico, and protects an area of 169.0 km2.

Flora and fauna
According to the National Biodiversity Information System of Comisión Nacional para el Conocimiento y Uso de la Biodiversidad (CONABIO) in Sierra de Álvarez Flora and Fauna Protection Area there are over 900 plant and animal species from which 39 are in at risk category and 21 are exotics.

References

Flora and fauna protection areas of Mexico
Protected areas of San Luis Potosí
Protected areas of the Sierra Madre Oriental